Yamla Pagla Deewana is a 2011 Indian Hindi-language action comedy film directed by Samir Karnik, featuring Dharmendra, Sunny Deol, and Bobby Deol in the lead roles. The film marks the second pair-up between the Deol family, after Apne (2007). The film's title is inspired from the song "Main Jat  Yamla Pagla Deewana" from the 1975 film, Pratigya also starring Dharmendra. The theatrical trailer of the film unveiled on 5 November 2010, whilst the film released on 14 January 2011, and received good response upon release. It turned out to be a box office hit. It is the first installment of Yamla Pagla Deewana film series and the 11th highest-grossing Bollywood film of 2011.

Plot
Paramvir Singh (Sunny Deol) is a Non-resident Indian (NRI) living happily with his Canadian wife Mary (Emma Brown Garett) along with his two kids Karam and Veer and his mother (Nafisa Ali) in Vancouver, British Columbia, Canada. Years ago, after the birth of Paramvir's younger brother Gajodhar, Paramvir's father, Dharam Singh (Dharmendra) had run away from home and took Gajodhar with him, due to difficulties with the family. Back in present, a Canadian comes to visit Paramvir at his home, where he sees Dharam Singh's photo. The Canadian recognises Dharam as a thief who had robbed him when he went to tour in Banaras. Upon hearing this news, Paramvir's mother sends him to Banaras to find his father, and younger brother.

When Paramvir reaches Banaras, he meets a youngster who cons him off all his money. Seeking help, Paramvir lands up at a bar, where he sees both Dharam Singh, and his brother Gajodhar Singh (Bobby Deol), who has now grown up. Paramvir realises Gajodhar is in fact the youngster who had earlier conned him, and is disappointed to see both his father and brother are con-men. When Paramvir sees Dharam alone, he confronts him and tells him his identity. However, Dharam refuses to acknowledge him as his son. Soon, Paramvir saves Gajodhar from getting attacked by goons, to which Gajodhar befriends him and accepts him to their team, not knowing that he is his elder brother.

During this time, Gajodhar falls in love with Saheba (Kulraj Randhawa), a Punjabi author. Dharam and Paramvir help him woo her, and the two start a relationship. Soon enough, Saheba's tough brothers find out, and beat Gajodhar up, and take Saheba back to Punjab. When Dharam sees that Gajodhar is hopeless, he breaks out, and asks Paramvir to help, and acknowledges that he is his father but he shouldn't tell Gajodhar anything about that, after which Paramvir and Gajodhar move to Punjab to get back his love.

Saheba's elder brother Joginder Singh (Anupam Kher) who is a cruel landlord of his village and her other brothers want to marry her to an NRI. Upon hearing this, Paramvir disguises Gajodhar up to make him look like a Punjabi, and they both go to Saheba's house, with Gajodhar pretending to be an NRI named Karamveer. On the other hand, Joginder has an arch-rival Minty (Puneet Issar) who wants to take Joginders place and doesn't want Joginder to win in upcoming elections. Joginder, after meeting both of them, decides that they would marry their sister to Paramvir, not to Gajodhar. However, Paramvir is already married. One night, Paramvir gets drunk and beats up Saheba's brothers but that only makes Joginder like him more. So Paramvir tells Gajodhar to run away with Saheba one night.

While they are making their escape, Dharam shows up with a band of musicians thus preventing Gajodhar and Saheba from running away because Dharam thinks Gajodhar is the one getting married not knowing that Saheba's family has chosen Paramvir. Dharam tells Paramvir and Gajodhar that Paramvir should be the one running away. So Paramvir attempts to go to the market but Poli brings him back home causing Joginder to think that Gajodhar and Dharam are joking as they said Paramvir is scared of marriage but unbeknownst to Dharam and Gajodhar, he is standing right behind them.

Joginder decides to get Poli married to Gajodhar after which Gajodhar and Saheba decide they will escape that very night. Again, they fail as Paramvir's wife Mary shows up with Karam and Veer (Paramvir's sons). Paramvir, Gajodhar and Dharam make up the story that she is their neighbour in Canada and that her husband is also named Paramvir who went missing last year. Mary knows that Paramvir is in front of her but chooses not to say anything because it will ruin the whole plan.

Joginder somehow finds out what has been on all this while and gets his men to attack Paramvir, Gajodhar and Dharam. Paramvir and Dharam beat his men up until Minty and his men show up. As Minty is about to attack Joginder, Gajodhar rescues him hence earning approval to marry Saheba. In the end, Dharam, Gajodhar, Paramvir, Mary, Saheba, Karam and Veer go to Canada where they live as one happy family.

Cast
 Dharmendra as Dharam Singh Dhillon
 Sunny Deol as Paramveer Singh Dhillon
 Bobby Deol as Gajodhar Singh Dhillon / Karamveer Singh Dhillon
 Kulraj Randhawa as Saheba Brar
 Nafisa Ali as Mother of Paramveer Singh Dhillon and Gajodhar Singh Dhillon
 Anupam Kher as Joginder Singh Brar
 Johny Lever as a Jeweller
 Puneet Issar as Tejpaal Singh aka Minty
 Mukul Dev as Gurmeet (Billa)
 Himanshu Malik as Tejinder (Jarnail)
 Sucheta Khanna as Poli
 Emma Brown Garett as Mary Dhillon
 Digvijay Rohildas as Balbir (Kaalu)
 Krip Suri as Sukhdev (Kohti)
 Nikunj Pandey as Karam
 Amit Mistry as Binda
 Ajay Devgn as Narrator
Gurbachchan Singh as Babbu
Edward Sonnenblick as Bobji
Lokesh Tilakdhari as Lokesh
Priyanka Lalwani as Special Role
 Madhuri Bhattacharya in an Item Song "Tinku Jiya"
 Mahek Chahal in an Item Song "Chamki Jawani"

Production
The filming started in February 2010. Director Samir Karnik along with the lead cast of Dharmendra and Sunny Deol started shooting in Varanasi in April 2010. The shooting was disrupted twice, first in March, due to the hospitalisation of Dharmendra, and then in July, when Sunny Deol faced back problems while filming an action sequence.

Reception

Critical response
The film received mostly positive reviews from critics. Taran Adarsh of Bollywood Hungama gave the film 3.5 stars out of 5 saying "it reminds the audience of the films of yesteryear with the typical masala." Gaurav Malani of the Times of India states, "This one is an entertainer and not without a reason". Mayank Shekhar of Hindustan Times rated it 2.5/5. Rajeev Masand of CNN-IBN says "Yamla Pagla Deewana is enjoyable" giving it 2.5 out of 5 stars. Pankaj Sabnani of Glamsham.com gave 3 out of 5 stating "The right dose of action, drama and comedy, combined with a fine story make Yamla Pagla Deewana a paisa vasool entertainer. Go for it!"

Box office
Yamla Pagla Deewana opened to a good response in India, raking in  240 million net over its first weekend and approximately  350 million net at the end of its first week. The film did particularly well in Punjab, Delhi and UP. It grossed approximately  8.50 crore in its second weekend taking the total gross to  430 million in ten days. The film had a 300% increase in collections on Republic Day and grossed  495.0 million by the end of its second week. In its third week, the film collected  35.1 million. After seven weeks the film's net collections were  549.3  million. In overseas markets, the film grossed around US$3,030,000. The total worldwide gross of the film amounted to 887.2  million.

Soundtrack
The music of the film is composed by Laxmikant-Pyarelal, Anu Malik, RDB, Nouman Javaid, Sandesh Shandilya, Rahul Seth, and Sanjoy Chowdhary. The lyrics are penned by Anand Bakshi, RDB, Rahul Seth, Nouman Javaid, Anu Malik, Irshad Kamil & Dharmendra. "Tinku Jiya" composed by Anu Malik was a chartbuster in 2011. The title song is the remake of the same song from the film Pratigya which was sung by Mohammed Rafi.

Track listing

Sequel

The sequel was announced after the success of the original, and the project began filming in September 2012. The first look of the film was also unveiled after its first schedule was completed also in September 2012. The sequel features the trio of Dharmendra, Sunny Deol and Bobby Deol reprising their roles, with Neha Sharma and debutant Kristina Akheeva as female leads. Yamla Pagla Deewana 2 released on 7 June 2013, and received mixed to negative response. The third installment of the series was released on 31 August 2018 reprising the original lead male actors and Kirti Kharbanda as actress. The film generally received negative reviews and was a box office disaster.

See also
Yamla Pagla Deewana (film series)
Yamla Pagla Deewana: Phir Se

References

External links
 
 

2010s Hindi-language films
2011 films
Indian comedy films
Films scored by Anu Malik
Films scored by Sandesh Shandilya
Films scored by Sanjoy Chowdhury
Films directed by Samir Karnik
Hindi-language comedy films
2011 comedy films